Golak may refer to:

Persian 
 Golak, Chaharmahal and Bakhtiari
 Golak, Gilan

Bulgarian
 Golak, Sofia Province

Serbian
 Golak (region)